Spaced Out in London is a 2004 live album by Hawkwind. It was recorded at a 2002 gig.

Track listing
"Earth Calling" (Robert Calvert)
"Aerospaceage Inferno" (Calvert)
"Angels of Death" (Dave Brock)
"Out of the Shadows" (Buckley, Brock, Alan Davey)
"Time Captives" (Arthur Brown)
"Master of the Universe" (Nik Turner, Brock)
"The Gremlin Song" (Calvert)
"Time and Confusion" (Brown)
"Hurry On Sundown" (Brock)
"Lighthouse" (Tim Blake)
"The Watcher" (Lemmy Kilmister)
"Assassins of Allah" [aka "Hassan I Sabbah"/"Space Is Their (Palestine)"] (Calvert, Paul Rudolph, Brock)
"Do That" [aka "You Shouldn't Do That"] (Turner, Brock)
"Earth Calling" (Calvert)

Personnel
Hawkwind
 Arthur Brown - vocals
 Dave Brock - guitar, keyboards, vocals
 Alan Davey - bass guitar, vocals
 Tim Blake - keyboards, vocals, virtual lead guitar 
 Richard Chadwick - drums

Credits
Recorded at Walthamstow Assembly Hall, London, 13 December 2002 by Colin Allen

Release history
Apr 2004: Voiceprint Records, HAWKSR001CD - limited edition sold at gigs and through the Hawkwind website.

References

Hawkwind live albums
2004 live albums